Derbez is a Spanish surname. Notable people with the surname include:

Eugenio Derbez (born 1961), Mexican actor, director and comedian
His daughter Aislinn Derbez (born 1987), an actress and model
His son Vadhir Derbez (born 1991), an actor
His son José Eduardo Derbez (born 1992), an actor
Luis Ernesto Derbez (born 1947), Mexican politician
Silvia Derbez (1932–2002), Mexican actress

Spanish-language surnames